William Gordon Everitt (7 October 1901 in Bromsgrove, Worcestershire – 3 August 1993 in Old Alresford, Hampshire) was an English racing driver. He started racing after being touted as the "next Dick Seaman". Eventually, Everitt entered eight races between 1933 and 1938 in mainly MG's, his best results being one victory and two third places.

Complete results

1901 births
1993 deaths
Sportspeople from Bromsgrove
English racing drivers
Grand Prix drivers